is a dam in Niimi, Okayama Prefecture, Japan, completed in 1964.

References 

Dams in Okayama Prefecture
Dams completed in 1964